The 1998–99  Liga Leumit season began on 22 August 1998 and ended on 29 May 1999, with Hapoel Haifa winning their first championship title ever.

That season had two rounds, each team played the other teams twice. The three teams that were relegated to Liga Artzit were:  Hapoel Tzafririm Holon, Hapoel Beit She'an and Maccabi Jaffa.

Two team from Liga Artzit were promoted at the end of the previous season: Hapoel Tzafririm Holon and Maccabi Jaffa. The two teams relegated were Hapoel Ashkelon and Hapoel Be'er Sheva.

Final table

Results

Top scorers

Notes

Liga Leumit seasons
Israel
1998–99 in Israeli football leagues